{{Infobox television 
| alt_name                 = Girl From Tomorrow
| image                    = TheGirlfromTomorrow.jpg
| image_alt                = The show's title in giant reflective gold font over an image of the Time Capsule launch room in the year 3000.
| caption                  = The Girl From Tomorrows title screen.
| genre                    = Sci-Fi/Time Travel/Adventure/Children's/Action
| creator                  = 
| writer                   = 
| director                 = Kathy Mueller
| starring                 = 
| voices                   = 
| theme_music_composer     = Ian Davidson
| composer                 = Ian Davidson
| country                  = Australia
| language                 = English
| num_seasons              = 2
| num_episodes             = 24
| executive_producer       = Ron Saunders
| producer                 = Noel Price
| camera                   = Single-camera
| runtime                  = 23–24 minutes
| company                  = 
| distributor              = 
| network                  = Channel Nine (Australia)
| picture_format           = PAL (576i)
| audio_format             = Stereo
| first_aired              = 
| last_aired               = 
| followed_by              = The Girl from Tomorrow Part II: Tomorrow's End
}}The Girl from Tomorrow''' is an Australian sci-fi children's television series produced by Film Australia. The series is based around Alana (Katharine Cullen), a girl from the year 3000. At the start of the series, she is kidnapped by Silverthorn, a criminal from the year 2500, and brought back in time to the year 1990.

While in the year 1990, she befriends Jenny (Melissa Marshall), who helps Alana adapt to life in a time unfamiliar to her, and later helps her to return to her own time.

A sequel series, The Girl from Tomorrow Part II: Tomorrow's End aired in 1993.

Premise
In the year 3000, the human race is in a state of Utopia. The major challenge facing them is continuing rebuilding the Earth after "The Great Disaster", a catastrophic event that took place in 2500 and nearly destroyed the entire Earth.
In order to investigate its causes, a scientist named Tulista is sent to the past using the Time Capsule, a device created by a scientist named Bruno. Upon the capsule's return, Tulista is held hostage by Silverthorn, a criminal from the year 2500, who is intent on conquering the future. Realizing that even though the year 3000 does not have weapons per se, his own weapons are no match to the superior technology of the Transducer, he manages to take Alana, Tulista's student, hostage, and escapes into the past, where he figures he will have a better chance. Arriving in 1990, Alana escapes, and later meets a teenager named Jenny Kelly, whose help she enlists in order to get back to the Capsule before it returns automatically to the future, leaving her stranded in the past. After thinking that the Capsule was destroyed, Jenny and Alana discover that it has been seized by Silverthorn, who is building his power and making vast amounts of money by using information from the Capsule's database, and will therefore not allow Alana to use it to return to her own time. Along with the help of Jenny's family and her teacher, Alana and Jenny must devise a plan to retrieve the Capsule while foiling Silverthorn's plans, so that Alana can return home to the year 3000.

Character profiles

Alana
Alana (Katharine Cullen) is a fourteen-year-old girl from the year 3000. Alana's parents live on Titan, Saturn's moon. They sent her to Earth to be educated. On Earth, she has guardians who teach her how to use the Transducer, so she can achieve her ambition of becoming a healer. Alana has three distinctive dots on the side of her face in the temple area. These dots signify that she is mature enough to use a Transducer. Taken in by the Kellys on arriving in 1990, Alana is given the name 'Alana Turner' and passed off as Irene's niece to avoid suspicion.

Silverthorn
Silverthorn (John Howard) is a villain from the year 2500. Silverthorn's most noticeable traits are his deviousness and violent tendencies. He can be very charming, but this is a front so he can double-cross people. He is also extremely brave, risking his life to save a drowning boy in order to gain Lorien's trust, and tests the Time Gate on himself when none of his cronies are willing. He kidnaps Alana and flees to 1990, where he hopes he can rule the world. While in 1990, Silverthorn makes himself a millionaire by accessing the Time Capsule's computer, finding out details of local horse races, then successfully betting on the winners - buying such luxuries as a large white stretch limousine (driven by Eddie) and a large house, as well as setting up a business called Futures Incorporated as a front for his devious plans. However, Silverthorn has an inoperable brain tumour as a result of being exposed to high levels of radiation in his own time period, occasionally suffering severe headaches that can cause him to collapse, and cannot obtain further supplies of the pills he brought with him from 2500 as they contain elements and minerals which have not yet been discovered. He has only one hope of survival - Alana and the Transducer...

Eddie
Eddie (Miles Buchanan) is a young street tough who acts as Silverthorn's chauffeur and henchman. He is not very bright and occasionally even clumsy, as a result of which Silverthorn gets angry with him, but is tolerated by his employer just so long as he is useful. In The Girl from Tomorrow Part II: Tomorrow's End, Eddie confesses that he doesn't have a driving licence.

Jenny Kelly
Jenny (Melissa Marshall) is from 1990. She is a typical teenager going through her rebellious phase. She has dyed her hair purple and plays the drums, she has aspirations of joining a band. When she's not at school she helps out in her mum's deli. Jenny hates living in Sydney, but when Alana arrives things start to get interesting.

Petey Kelly
Petey (James Findlay) is like any other nine-year-old boy from 1990. He is the brother of Jenny. He enjoys dressing up in his home-made superhero outfit, and calls himself "Captain Zero". Petey also has a great love of sci-fi, which comes in handy when things get tough.

Irene Kelly
Irene (Helen O'Connor) is Jenny and Petey's mother. She is the owner of the Kelly Deli. Like most mums, she is very protective of her children, so much so that she is more than willing to stand up to Silverthorn alone in order to protect them.

James Rooney
James (Andrew Clarke) is the science teacher at the high school Jenny attends. Irene fell for him when she met him after enrolling Alana there. James helped all the others in their efforts to retrieve the Capsule so Alana could return home.

Technology in the year 2500
The most often used weapon in use in the year 2500 is the laser pistol. When the pistol is used, the trigger is held allowing energy to build up within the object and once the trigger is released the energy within the object causes it to explode.

Technology in the year 3000
In the year 3000, all scientific experiments and technological advancements are carried out within the Science Dome. One area within the Science Dome is the Time Laboratory. This is where all time travel experiments are performed. Technology used in the laboratory includes the Time Capsule, and the temporal flux generators, as well as other diagnostic tools. Below follows a short list of significant technology used in the future.

The Time Capsule
The Time Capsule is a time exploration vehicle. It was invented by a scientist named Bruno in the year 3000. The Capsule is exactly  in height and width. Its composition in the series is unspecified, but as a real prop, it is a dark green steel frame model of a Rhombicuboctahedron plated with semidiagonal steel bars and plated with semitransparent plexiglas from the inside, except on the front side which is completely transparent. Inside is a command place for one passenger, although the vehicle can accept several people. It stands on a 20 cm tall black base. Its front sides are capable of opening like a two-sided door. The Capsule is equipped with the most advanced computer system available in the future. The history and knowledge from before The Great Disaster is held within its memory banks. The command panel is represented by a green prism in the centre of the vehicle, which communicates with the upper control panel, situated below the topmost side. In the second season, a security device is added - a hexagonal plate palm scanner, right from the front side. The Capsule is equipped with survival mechanisms capable of synthesizing water and protein nutrients from the atmosphere.

Bruno invented the Time Capsule so that people in the year 3000 could investigate the causes of The Great Disaster, a terrible event that almost destroyed the entire Earth. The Capsule's computer also responds to verbal commands. When the Time Capsule is programmed with a set of temporal co-ordinates it draws energy from the temporal flux generators and begins to spin slowly at first and then gathering speed, which is followed by two sounds: a saw wave sound gradually increasing in frequency and a looping sequence (sound that exponentially grows in frequency and then falls low again) increasing in frequency, too. Soon when the part of the energy is transferred from the generators to the Capsule, a blue sparkled energy field then forms around the Capsule. Its sides begin to vibrate in light, followed by a slightly yellow glow in the centre of the vehicle. When the energy is sufficient, the vehicle explodes out of its present time in a flash of light and rain of yellow sparks, and explodes into the time set by the co-ordinates, which is followed by the same sawtooth sound, only with decreasing frequency, hence giving the impression of a cooling process. Upon arrival, the Capsule is regularly covered with soot residue. The Time Capsule will only remain in the past for twenty-eight days unless specified differently.

Personal Computer Companion
In the year 3000, everybody owns a Computer Companion. It is a miniaturised computer that can be worn on the wrist. The computer is programmed with an artificial intelligence. These computers are capable of a variety of actions. Mostly they are used to tell the time and give advice to the wearer, and they can also record and play holograms. The Companions worn by children also teach manners to the wearer as they will not comply with commands if there is any insincerity in the voice, and only respond when asked politely. The advanced technology contained in the computer enables it to interface with other computers and any other electronic devices.

The Transducer
The Transducer is a tool that is used by everyone in the year 3000. Alana was only learning to use the Transducer when she was kidnapped by Silverthorn. The Transducer looks like a headband with a crystal in the centre of a black drop-like plate. The Transducer from the year 3000 has several colours of radiation. Blue is used when the carrier tries to levitate objects, pink for healing, purple for specific interactions with other force fields, and red radiation forms as a result of strong feelings (intentional or unintentional) which destroy matter. The first transducer uses white radiation.

The Transducer was invented in the year 2500 by a woman named Maeve. She invented it to be a tool of healing. After The Great Disaster occurred in the year 2500, the Transducer was mass-produced and the people were taught how to use it. It was to be used as a tool to rebuild the planet. A replica of the original Transducer is held in the Science Dome in the year 3000. The Transducer functions by enhancing and magnifying the telepathic function of the pituitary gland, by doing this the user is able to levitate objects and heal wounds. If used in the wrong way the Transducer can be used as a weapon to destroy things; this is why the people of the year 3000 are taught from an early age to control their emotions.

Episode list

Telecast and home media
The series aired in Ireland along with its sequel, The Girl from Tomorrow Part II: Tomorrow's End, on RTÉ Two from 26 February 1991 to 1995. Several years later, the series was brought to the U.S. by Retro Television Network

A four-disc DVD set containing all 12 episodes of The Girl from Tomorrow was released on 18 September 2006 (Region 0) around Australia into various retail outlets via Shock Exports. The entire series of The Girl from Tomorrow Part II: Tomorrow's End was released on 4 May 2007. All DVDs released so far have been in PAL format, and Region 0 encoded. Both series are out of print.

The series is available for streaming over iTunes.

Currently, the series can be seen on Amazon Prime and Google Play, but only for the United Kingdom in addition to being available on YouTube. Most episodes have added for free on Tubi.

Awards
The series was a finalist in the Youth Series category in the 1990 New York Film & TV Festival. The movie version received the following awards:

 1990 Cairo International Film Festival For Children: Golden Cairo Award for Best Film
 1990 Festival International March de l’audiovisuel et programme jeunesse: Award for Best Drama
 1991 Houston Film Festival: Bronze Award

 See also 
 List of Australian television series
 Guest from the Future – a Soviet sci-fi mini-series with similar premise, which predates the Australian series
 Návštěvníci (TV series) – a Czechoslovak sci-fi television series along similar lines, which even predates the Soviet series

References

 External links 
 
 
 The Girl From Tomorrow'' at ClassicKidsTV.co.uk
 
 

Australian children's television series
Australian time travel television series
Television shows set in Sydney
Nine Network original programming
BBC children's television shows
1990 Australian television series debuts
1993 Australian television series endings
Television series about teenagers